This is a list of mayors of Enid, a city in the U.S. state of Oklahoma.

Mayors of Enid

References
 Bass, Henry Benjamin, The First 75 Years: D. C. Bass & Sons Construction Company, 1893-1968 (1969)
 Enid on the Move, October 2011, pgs 10-11

Enid